Gamsammot Park is a park that is located in Daegu Seo-gu, South Korea. There was Gamsam-mot (Lake). The name is changed from Gamsam Park to Gamsammot Park in November 2010.
The area is comparatively small to 16,332 m².
There are Dalseong High School, Gyungun Middle School, Duryu Park etc. near the Gamsam park.
It is close to the Duryu Station of Daegu Subway Line 2.

References
 http://100.naver.com/100.nhn?docid=821097

Parks in Daegu
Seo District, Daegu